Mexican Spitfire at Sea is a 1942 American comedy film directed by Leslie Goodwins and written by Charles E. Roberts and Jerry Cady. It is the fourth film in the Mexican Spitfire series, which began in 1939. The film stars Lupe Vélez, Leon Errol, Charles "Buddy" Rogers, ZaSu Pitts, Elisabeth Risdon, and Florence Bates. The film was released on March 13, 1942, by RKO Radio Pictures.

Plot
Carmelita Lindsay (Lupe Vélez) believes she's finally going away on a honeymoon, which she has been unable to arrange due to her husband Dennis's constant business deals. Dennis (Charles "Buddy" Rogers) secretly intends to use this ocean voyage to sell advertising to the well-to-do Baldwins (Florence Bates and Harry Holman), with help from his Uncle Matt and Aunt Della (Leon Errol and Elisabeth Risdon).

On the cruise, a quarrel with Carmelita results in Dennis being thrown out of his cabin and into another occupied by Parisian blonde Fifi Russell (Marion Martin). The Baldwins, assuming that Dennis and Fifi are man and wife, insist on arranging a meeting with British nobleman Lord Epping. Mistaken identities multiply thereafter, as Carmelita recruits Uncle Matt to pose as Lord Epping, and they both prevail upon passenger Emily Pepper (ZaSu Pitts) to impersonate Lady Epping. Further complicating matters, Carmelita and Dennis's business rival (Eddie Dunn) make Dennis jealous.

The multiple motives and identities become so scrambled that Uncle Matt is cornered. He desperately sounds an alarm, evacuating the passengers so he can escape in the confusion.

Cast 
 Lupe Vélez as Carmelita Lindsay
 Leon Errol as Uncle Matt Lindsay / Lord Basil Epping
 Charles "Buddy" Rogers as Dennis Lindsay
 ZaSu Pitts as Emily Pepper
 Elisabeth Risdon as Aunt Della Lindsay
 Florence Bates as Minerva Baldwin
 Marion Martin as Fifi Russell
 Lydia Bilbrook as Lady Ada Epping
 Eddie Dunn as George Skinner
 Harry Holman as Joshua Baldwin
 Marten Lamont as Purser

References

External links 
 
 
 
 

1942 films
American black-and-white films
RKO Pictures films
Films directed by Leslie Goodwins
1942 comedy films
Films produced by Cliff Reid
American comedy films
1940s English-language films
1940s American films